In algebraic geometry, an irreducible algebraic set or irreducible variety is an algebraic set that cannot be written as the union of two proper algebraic subsets. An irreducible component is an algebraic subset that is irreducible and maximal (for set inclusion) for this property.

It is a fundamental theorem of classical algebraic geometry that every algebraic set may be written in a unique way as a finite union of irreducible components.

These concepts can be reformulated in purely topological terms, using the Zariski topology, for which the closed sets are the algebraic subsets: A topological space is irreducible if it is not the union of two proper closed subsets, and an irreducible component is a maximal subspace (necessarily closed) that is irreducible for the induced topology. Although these concepts may be considered for every topological space, this is rarely done outside algebraic geometry, since most common topological spaces are Hausdorff spaces, and, in a Hausdorff space, the irreducible components are the singletons.

In topology 
A topological space X is reducible if it can be written as a union  of two closed proper subsets ,  of 
A topological space is irreducible (or hyperconnected) if it is not reducible. Equivalently, X is irreducible if all non empty open subsets of X are dense, or if any two nonempty open sets have nonempty intersection.

A subset F of a topological space X is called irreducible or reducible, if F considered as a topological space via the subspace topology has the corresponding property in the above sense.

An irreducible component of a topological space is a maximal irreducible subset. If a subset is irreducible, its closure is also irreducible, so irreducible components are closed.

Every irreducible subset of a space X is contained in a (not necessarily unique) irreducible component of X.  Every point  is contained in some irreducible component of X.

In algebraic geometry 

Every affine or projective algebraic set is defined as the set of the zeros of an ideal in a polynomial ring. An irreducible algebraic set, more commonly known as an algebraic variety is an algebraic set that cannot be decomposed as the union of two smaller algebraic sets. Lasker–Noether theorem implies that every algebraic set is the union of a finite number of uniquely defined algebraic sets, called its irreducible components. These notions of irreducibility and irreducible components are exactly the above defined ones, when the Zariski topology is considered, since the algebraic sets are exactly the closed sets of this topology.

The spectrum of a ring is a topological space whose points are the prime ideals and the closed sets are the sets of all prime ideals that contain a fixed ideal. For this topology, a closed set is irreducible if it is the set of all prime ideals that contain some prime ideal, and the irreducible components correspond to minimal prime ideals. The number of irreducible components is finite in the case of a Noetherian ring. 

A scheme is obtained by gluing together spectra of rings in the same way that a manifold is obtained by gluing together charts. So the definition of irreducibility and irreducible components extends immediately to schemes.

Examples 
In a Hausdorff space, the irreducible subsets and the irreducible components are the singletons. This is the case, in particular, for the real numbers. The set  cannot be irreducible since 

The notion of irreducible component is fundamental in algebraic geometry and rarely considered outside this area of mathematics: consider the algebraic subset of the plane
.
The set  is thus reducible with these two lines as irreducible components.

The spectrum of a commutative ring is the set of the prime ideals of the ring, endowed with the Zariski topology, for which a set of prime ideals is closed if and only if it is the set of all prime ideals that contain a fixed ideal. In this case an irreducible subset is the set of all prime ideals that contain a fixed prime ideal.

Notes 

Algebraic geometry
General topology
Algebraic varieties

fr:Dimension_de_Krull#Composantes_irr.C3.A9ductibles